Fast or FAST may refer to:

 Fast (noun), high speed or velocity
 Fast (noun, verb), to practice fasting, abstaining from food and/or water for a certain period of time

Acronyms and coded

Computing and software
 Faceted Application of Subject Terminology, a thesaurus of subject headings
 Facilitated Application Specification Techniques, a team-oriented approach for requirement gathering
 FAST protocol, an adaptation of the FIX protocol, optimized for streaming
 FAST TCP, a TCP congestion avoidance algorithm
 FAST and later as Fast Search & Transfer, a Norwegian company focusing on data search technologies
 Fatigue Avoidance Scheduling Tool, software to develop work schedules
 Features from accelerated segment test, computer vision method for corner detection
 Federation Against Software Theft, a UK organization that pursues those who illegally distribute software
 Feedback arc set in Tournaments, a computational problem in graph theory
 USENIX Conference on File and Storage Technologies

Government
 Faʻatuatua i le Atua Samoa ua Tasi, a political party in Samoa
 Fixing America's Surface Transportation Act, passed by the United States Congress
 Foreign-Deployed Advisory and Support Teams, a former program of the US Drug Enforcement Administration; see 
 Free and Secure Trade, a Canada-United States and Mexico-United States program to facilitate faster cross border trade

Military
 Fleet Antiterrorism Security Team, a branch of the United States Marine Corps
 Fuel And Sensor Tactical packs, a type of conformal fuel tank developed for the F-15
 Future Assault Shell Technology helmet,  a combat helmet of United States of America.

Organizations
 Farnborough Air Sciences Trust, an aviation museum
 Financial Alliance for Sustainable Trade
 Firefighter assist and search team, a team of firefighters dedicated to the rescue of other firefighters
 Fulbright Academy of Science & Technology

Science and medicine
 FAST (stroke) (Face, Arm, Speech, and Time), a mnemonic for the symptoms of a stroke
 Farpoint Asteroid Search Team, an asteroid search team located at the Farpoint Observatory
 Fast Auroral Snapshot Explorer, one in the series of NASA's Small Explorer spacecraft
 Five-hundred-meter Aperture Spherical Telescope, a large single-dish radio telescope in Guizhou province, China
 Fluorescence-activating and absorption-shifting tag, genetically-encoded protein tag used in molecular biology
 Focused assessment with sonography for trauma, an ultrasound used to examine the abdomen of a trauma patient
 Fourier amplitude sensitivity testing, a variance-based global sensitivity analysis method
 Future Attribute Screening Technology

Other acronyms
 Fifteen and Send Time, a type of dog agility competition
 Fairfield and Suisun Transit
 Free ad-supported streaming television

Arts and entertainment
 "Fast" (Luke Bryan song), 2016
 Fast (Juice Wrld song), 2019
 "Fast", a song by Chief Keef and Zaytoven from GloToven, 2019
 Fast, an album by Custom, 2002
 Fast, a 2010 short film starring Charlyne Yi
 "Fast (Motion)", 2021 song by Saweetie
 The Fast Saga, a film series in the F&F franchise

People

People with the surname
 Alexia Fast (born 1992), Canadian actress
 Christian Fast (1762–1841), American soldier and pioneer
 Herman Becker Fast (1887-1945), American businessman, farmer, and politician
 Howard Fast (1914–2003), American novelist and television writer
 Jesper Fast (born 1991), Swedish ice hockey player
 Jonathan Fast (born 1948), American author, son of Howard Fast
 Julius Fast (1919–2008), American author, brother of Howard Fast
  Matt Fast, lead singer of the Canadian punk band The Undecided
 Molly Jong-Fast (born 1978), American author, daughter of Jonathan Fast
 Piotr Fast (born 1951), Polish professor and translator

People with the nickname
 Brian Leiser (born 1972), nicknamed "Fast", musician
 Fast Eddie (disambiguation)

Other uses
 Fast Product, a record label

See also
 Nacional Fast Clube, a Brazilian football club
 Fast bowling, a practice in cricket
 
 Fast Company (disambiguation)
 Faster (disambiguation)

Russian Mennonite surnames